Conflict analysis or conflict assessment is an initial stage of conflict resolution in which parties seek to gain a deeper understanding of the dynamics in their relationship.

When there is a disagreement in the methods used to achieve an end result, and there is a disparity between a unified vision and direction, opposing sides are subject to conflict. If these sides consistently misinterpret one another, a problematic situation can spiral out of control rapidly. Conflicts are not always linear in nature. Members of multiple organizational levels with varying statuses can all partake in conflict. When undergoing analysis, it is integral to understand the reasons that spark such disagreement to effectively reach its resolution. Many schools, such as Eastern Mennonite University's Center for Justice and Peacebuilding, George Mason University, Nova Southeastern University, University of the Rockies, and Wayne State University have programs related to conflict analysis and resolution. There are also various subsets of conflict analysis such as environmental conflict analysis, which deal with specific types of disputes. In certain occasions a conflict atlas is used to show graphically the analysis of the conflict. The prefixes macro- and micro- are used in conjunctions with conflicts to denote the scale of the conflict, macro referring to a larger scale conflict and micro referring to a conflicting situation on a smaller scale. Conflicts can arise at different levels, from intrapersonal to interpersonal issues as well as between two individuals or between two countries as a whole. The outcome dictates how we refer to a given conflict. When a result is the change in the status quo, that conflict is now referred to as a revolution.

Identity 

Celia Cook-Hoffman defines 'Identity' as "how individuals and collectives see and understand themselves in a conflict." Identity plays a vital role in a conflicting situation. How the opponent perceives their competition dictates how they will move forward with the conflict. Conversely, the opponent is also aware of how they are perceived and understands they are obligated to maintain their reputation throughout the conflict. This can give rise to defensive tactics as well as to retaliation. In this aspect, identity is not unlike reputation. Identities are a social construct, and once cemented, are almost impossible to alter.

Gender 

Snyder writes that women are seen as "victims" of war. Gender proves to be significant in the analysis of conflicts. Women are likely to be perceived as individuals who have no control of a conflict. Snyder also notes that women are "considered legitimate targets and make up 90 percent of all casualties." The majority of refugees are also females. In conflicts such as war, widows are forced to become the new head of the household, assuming all the responsibilities that their husband would normally do so. Also, when contemplating a resolution of a conflict, the lack of inclusion of women from an issues inception to execution has an effect on post-conflict analysis.

Causation 

Rothbart notes that factors that spark international conflict are "struggles between beliefs, behaviors, and environmental conditions as they are as they should be." Another motive that inspires conflict is the need for retribution. It is said that major conflicts can arise from underlying historical disagreements that bubble over periodically. It is also found that the aggressor's identity plays a role in causation of a conflict.

Victims 

In times of war Korostelina writes that "non-combatants suffer most"  because they are nothing but victims of any conflict. More innocent civilian blood is shed than any other conflict-related party. Korostelina also adds that civilians "are war's survivors or its collateral damage  accentuating the fact that prisoners of war are likely to be the individuals who suffer most during any conflict.

Mediation 
Bercovitch notes that there are several methods to conflict mediation. Bercovitch lists these methods as "negotiation, inquiry, conciliation, arbitration, judicial settlements, and resorts to regional agencies and arrangements."

See also 
 Conflict
 Conflict continuum
 Conflict management
 Conflict resolution
 Conflict theories
 Cost of conflict
 Mediation
 Negotiation
 Peace
 Peace and conflict studies
 Restorative justice

References

External links 
 Amsterdam Center for Conflict Studies (ACS)
 Centre for International Conflict Analysis and Management (CICAM) (Nijmegen, Netherlands)

Conflict (process)